Dead Again may refer to:

Film 
Dead Again, a 1991 film starring Kenneth Branagh and Emma Thompson
Dead Again, a South Korean film directed by Dave Silberman

Television 
 Dead Again, a 2014-2015 A&E television series with one of the producers being Dick Wolf
 "Dead Again", an episode in the 4th season of television series Kojak
 "Dead Again", a 2002 episode in the 9th season of television series ER
 "Dead Again", a 2003 episode in the first season of television series Wild Card
 "Dead Again", a 2007 episode in the 6th season of television series Crossing Jordan
 "Dead Again", a 2016 episode in the 8th season of television series Castle

Music 
"Dead Again", single on the album Bed of Stone by Aṣa
Dead Again (Mercyful Fate album), an album by Mercyful Fate
Dead Again (Type O Negative album), an album by Type O Negative
 "Dead Again", a song by Buckcherry from his debut album Buckcherry